Black & White is a 2008 Indian crime thriller film co-produced and directed by Subhash Ghai. The film stars Anil Kapoor, Anurag Sinha, Shefali Shah, and Aditi Sharma. The film explores the life of an Afghan suicide bomber who is sent on a mission on Indian Independence Day.
Upon release, the film received wide critical acclaim, and was premiered at the International Film Festivals of Pune and Delhi.

Plot
Rajan Mathur (Anil Kapoor) is an Urdu professor who lives in Chandni Chowk district in New Delhi, with his wife Roma Mathur (Shefali Shah), who is a social activist and feminist, and their young daughter.

Professor Mathur meets Numair Qazi (Anurag Sinha), who informs him that he is a victim of communal riots in Gujarat. He is actually a suicide bomber of an Islamic fundamentalist group who has been ordered to set off a bomb near Red Fort during the Independence day celebrations.

Numair wins the trust of the professor and his wife. While assisting Numair to get an entry pass for the celebrations at Red Fort, Professor Mathur introduces him to people living in harmony in Chandni Chowk regardless of faith.

Numair is no longer sure if he should carry out the orders of his superiors or not. Although he is a deep-rooted fundamentalist, he sees this area as colourful and loving. There is no black and white. Nonetheless, he goes forward to accomplish his mission.

Cast
 Anil Kapoor: Rajan Mathur, Urdu Professor 
 Anurag Sinha: Numair Qazi
 Habib Tanvir: Gaffar Bhai, Qazi Saab
 Shefali Shah: Roma Mathur 
 Aditi Sharma: Shagufta
 Sai Tamhankar: Nimmo
 Arun Bakshi: Naeem Shaikh
 Milind Gunaji: Hamid
 Nawazuddin Siddiqui: Tahir Tayyabuddin
 Mushtaq Khan: Mohanlal Agarwal – MLA
Akash Khurana: Waajir Sahab
Vikrant Chaturvedi: 
Saurabh Dubey

Music

References

External links
 

2008 films
2000s Hindi-language films
Films directed by Subhash Ghai
Films set in Delhi
Films about organised crime in India
Films about terrorism in India
Indian crime thriller films
2008 crime thriller films